Oxalis obtusa is a species of flowering plant in the genus Oxalis. It is endemic to the Cape Provinces, and occurs up to KwaZulu-Natal.

Conservation status 
Oxalis obtusa is classified as Least Concern.

References

External links 
 
 

Endemic flora of South Africa
Flora of South Africa
Flora of the Cape Provinces
obtusa